Wojciech Dariusz Grzyb (born 4 January 1981) is a Polish former  volleyball player, member of the Poland men's national volleyball team, silver medallist at the 2006 World Championship, Polish Champion (2012, 2013).

Personal life
Grzyb was born in Olsztyn, Poland. He is married to Katarzyna. They have three children – son Michał (born 2004) and two daughters: Lena and the youngest - Liliana (born 13 August 2013).

Career
He debuted in PlusLiga with AZS Olsztyn in 2000. With the club from Olsztyn, he won two silver medals of the Polish championship. From 2009 to 2014 he was a player of Asseco Resovia Rzeszów. With Rzeszów he won two titles of Polish Champion, in seasons 2011/2012 and 2012/2013. In June 2014 Grzyb signed a contract with LOTOS Trefl Gdańsk. In the season 2014/2015 LOTOS Trefl Gdańsk, including Grzyb won the Polish Cup and the silver medal of Polish Championship. In May 2015 he extended his contract with LOTOS Trefl Gdańsk until 2017.

Sporting achievements

Clubs
 CEV Cup
  2011/2012 – with Asseco Resovia
 National championships
 2011/2012  Polish Championship, with Asseco Resovia
 2012/2013  Polish Championship, with Asseco Resovia
 2013/2014  Polish SuperCup, with Asseco Resovia
 2014/2015  Polish Cup, with Trefl Gdańsk
 2015/2016  Polish SuperCup, with Trefl Gdańsk
 2017/2018  Polish Cup, with Trefl Gdańsk

State awards
 2006:  Gold Cross of Merit

References

External links

 Player profile at PlusLiga.pl
 Player profile at Volleybox.net

1981 births
Living people
Sportspeople from Olsztyn
Polish men's volleyball players
Polish Champions of men's volleyball
Recipients of the Gold Cross of Merit (Poland)
AZS Olsztyn players
Resovia (volleyball) players
Trefl Gdańsk players
Middle blockers